Orsa is a genus of moths of the family Erebidae. The genus was erected by Francis Walker in 1865.

Species
Orsa deleta Hampson, 1924 Trinidad
Orsa erythrospila Walker, 1865 Brazil (Amazonas)
Orsa orbifera Hampson, 1926 Brazil (Espírito Santo)
Orsa tenuata Kaye, 1901 Trinidad

References

Calpinae